Eros Medaglia (born 7 September 1994) is an Argentine footballer who plays for R.E. Virton as a right back.

References

External links

1994 births
Living people
Association football defenders
Argentine footballers
Club Atlético Vélez Sarsfield footballers
Atlético Tucumán footballers
Guaraní Antonio Franco footballers
Gimnasia y Esgrima de Mendoza footballers
Atlético de Rafaela footballers
Club Atlético San Miguel footballers
R.E. Virton players
Primera B Metropolitana players
Primera Nacional players
Argentine Primera División players
Torneo Federal A players
Challenger Pro League players
People from Ramos Mejía
Sportspeople from Buenos Aires Province